Hajji Kandi-ye Sofla (also Romanized as Ḩājjī Kandī-ye Soflá) is a village in Charuymaq-e Jonubegharbi Rural District, in the Central District of Charuymaq County, East Azerbaijan Province, Iran. At the 2006 census, its population was 39, in 7 families.

References 

Populated places in Charuymaq County